Microdesmis caseariifolia is a plant in the family Pandaceae. It is found in Bangladesh, Myanmar, Cambodia, Indonesia, Laos, Malaysia, Philippines, Vietnam. Leaf colour is green. Flower colour is yellow.

References

Pandaceae
Flora of tropical Asia